Nevada Irrigation District (NID) is an agency in Northern California that supplies water for much of Nevada County and portions of Placer and Yuba Counties. The water is used for irrigation, municipal and domestic purposes. It was established in 1921.

The Nevada Irrigation District owns and operates a system of ten reservoirs, many part of the Yuba-Bear Hydroelectric Project. These include:

 Bowman Reservoir, 
 Combie Reservoir, 
 Faucherie Reservoir, 
 French Lake Reservoir, 
 Jackson Lake Reservoir, 
 Jackson Meadows Reservoir, 
 Rollins Reservoir,   
 Sawmill Reservoir, 
 Scotts Flat Reservoir, 

The district also has seven hydroelectric plants. Unlike many of California's irrigation districts, it is not an electrical utility.

References

External links
 

Water management authorities in California
Irrigation Districts of the United States
Government of Nevada County, California
Government of Placer County, California
Government of Yuba County, California
1921 establishments in California
Government agencies established in 1921